James John McCarthy (born January 1956) is a British businessman, chief executive officer (CEO) of Poundland, the British discount store chain.

Early life
James John McCarthy was born in January 1956 in Nuneaton, Warwickshire and grew up in suburban Birmingham, one of three sons of an Army turned Scottish and Newcastle brewers sales rep father. He was educated at St Philip's Grammar School, but left aged 17.

Career
In 2006, McCarthy joined Poundland as CEO from Sainsbury's, where he had been head of its convenience store business.

Personal life
He and his wife Rosie have two sons.

References

Living people
1956 births
British chief executives
Businesspeople from Birmingham, West Midlands
People educated at St Philip's School